The County of Hawaii, Office of the Prosecuting Attorney, Criminal Investigations Unit is the law enforcement agency for the County of Hawaii, Office of the Prosecuting Attorney. It is tasked with full state police powers to enforces all State laws and Department rules, conducts investigations of the most complex, confidential, and diverse civil/criminal cases being considered and/or readied for court action and prosecution; obtains additional information, evidence, and facts to clarify or substantiate findings of law enforcement agencies; secures, interviews, and interrogates witnesses complainants, and suspects; conducts highly confidential investigations for the Attorney General's Office; special career criminal suppression investigations; arrest subjects, processes and serves legal papers; conduct warrant investigations and extraditions; coordinates investigations and works closely with the Hawai‘i Police Department, military, and federal law enforcement agencies, and all levels of the court system.

Investigators
Are armed and have the powers and privileges of police officers with state wide jurisdiction to effect arrest and conduct criminal investigations. Most Investigators are experienced law enforcement officers with other state or local police agencies prior to being employed with the Office.

Investigators conduct investigations of the most complex, confidential, and diverse criminal cases being considered and/or readied for court action and prosecution; obtains additional information, evidence, and facts to clarify or substantiate findings of law enforcement agencies; secures, interviews, and interrogates witnesses complainants, and suspects; conducts highly confidential investigations for the Attorney General's Office; special career criminal suppression investigations; arrest subjects, processes and serves legal papers; conduct warrant investigations and extraditions; coordinates investigations and works closely with the Hawai‘i Police Department, military, and federal law enforcement agencies, and all levels of the court system.

Agency description
Under authority of the Attorney General; the Office of the Prosecuting Attorney is the legal agency responsible for prosecuting all violations of State and County laws, ordinances, rules, and/or regulations on behalf of the Big Island community as provided by Hawai‘i County Charter Article IX: Chapter 28; H.R.S. 28-1.

Criminal Investigations Unit, ranks structure 
Criminal Investigations Unit uses the Hawaii State Law Enforcement Rank Structure;

Investigator VI, SR-26 (Chief Investigator)
Investigator V, SR-24 (Captain/Major) 
Investigator IV, SR-22 (Lieutenant) 
Investigator III, SR-20 (Sergeant) 
Investigator II, SR-18 (Corporal) 
Investigator I, SR-16 (Officer)

Victim services
Investigator's work with the Victim Service Unit in helping crime victims through the difficult process.

See also
List of law enforcement agencies in Hawaii
Government of Hawaii

References

External links
 Hawaiicounty.gov
 Hawaiicounty.gov

Specialist law enforcement agencies of the United States
State law enforcement agencies of Hawaii